Jonathan Burton may refer to:

Jonathan Burton (passenger), on Southwest Airlines Flight 1763
Jonathan Burton (director), of the film Locker
General Jonathan Burton, namesake of Burton, New Hampshire
Jonathan Burton, musician on Malaco Records

See also
Jon Burton, video game designer
John Burton (disambiguation)